Liberation: Songs to Benefit PETA is a compilation album released on the Fat Wreck Chords record label in 2003. As the title implies, it is a benefit album for the animal rights organization, PETA.

Track listing
 "Remedy" - Hot Water Music  – 2:38
 "More Depalma, Less Fellini" - Good Riddance  – 1:49
 "Fuck Ted Nugent" - Goldfinger  – 1:56
 "Agenda Suicide" - The Faint  – 3:57
 "Purina Hall Of Fame" - Propagandhi  – 4:42
 "Lifestyles Of The Rich & Famous" (Acoustic) - Good Charlotte  – 3:07
 "Beyond The Shadows" - District 7  – 1:54
 "Russell Crowe's Band" - Frenzal Rhomb  – 1:11
 "And The Hero Will Drown" - Story of the Year  – 3:12
 "I Could Never Hate You" - The Eyeliners  – 2:22
 "Bring Out Your Dead" - Anti-Flag  – 2:14
 "Man And Wife, The Latter" (Damaged Goods) - Desaparecidos  – 3:52
 "Waste" - Bigwig  – 1:29
 "This House Is Not A Home" (Acoustic) - Midtown  – 2:50
 "Just A Little" - The Used  – 3:26
 "Clams Have Feelings Too" - NOFX  – 2:36

See also
 Fat Wreck Chords compilations

References

Fat Wreck Chords compilation albums
2003 compilation albums